Shorea bakoensis is a species of tree in the family Dipterocarpaceae. It is endemic to Borneo, where it is confined to Sarawak.

References

bakoensis
Endemic flora of Borneo
Trees of Borneo
Flora of Sarawak
Taxonomy articles created by Polbot